Cambridge Municipal Airport  is two miles northeast of Cambridge, in Furnas County, Nebraska. The FAA's National Plan of Integrated Airport Systems for 2011–2015 called it a general aviation facility.

Many U.S. airports use the same three-letter location identifier for the FAA and IATA, but Cambridge has FAA code CSB and has no IATA code. (Caransebeș Airport in Caransebeş, Romania has IATA code CSB.)

Facilities
Its one runway, 14/32, is 4,098 by 60 feet (1,249 x 18 m) asphalt.

In the year ending June 29, 2009 the airport had 7,000 aircraft operations, average 19 per day: 96% general aviation, 2% air taxi, and 1% military. Seven aircraft were then based at the airport: five single-engine and two multi-engine.

References

External links 
 Cambridge (CSB) at Nebraska Department of Aeronautics
 Aerial photo as of 11 April 1999 from USGS The National Map
 
 

Airports in Nebraska
Buildings and structures in Furnas County, Nebraska